Hodge v R is a famous Privy Council decision on interpreting the Constitution of Canada. This was the first time the doctrine of double aspect was applied to division of powers analysis.

Background

Under the Liquor Licence Act (known as the "Crooks Act" after Adam Crooks), the Legislative Assembly of Ontario delegated authority to the License Commissioners of Toronto to pass a resolution that prohibited the use of billiard tables during any time when the sale of alcohol was permitted.

Archibald Hodge was licensed to sell liquor in his tavern, and was also licensed to operate a billiard saloon. In May 1881, he was convicted of allowing a billiard table to be used during the hours authorized for selling liquor. He sued in the Court of Queen's Bench to have the conviction quashed, on the grounds that:

the resolution of the License Commissioners was illegal and unauthorized,
the License Commissioners had no authority to pass such a resolution, and
the Liquor Licence Act was ultra vires provincial jurisdiction.

Court of Queen's Bench

In June 1881, the Court of Queen's Bench, in a unanimous ruling, quashed the conviction. In his judgment, Hagarty CJ held that the Legislative Assembly could not delegate to another body that the authority to create offences.

Court of Appeal for Ontario
In June 1882, on appeal, the Court of Appeal for Ontario reversed the Queen's Bench decision and affirmed the conviction. Opinions rendered by Spragge CJ and Burton JA, which were joined by Patterson and Morrison JJ, held that the Assembly had jurisdiction to legislate in the matter and that it could delegate its authority to another body.

On those points, Hodge appealed to the Privy Council.

Privy Council

The Appeal Court decision was upheld by the Board. In his ruling, Lord Fitzgerald held that the province had the authority to delegate any of its residual powers under section 92(16).

Fitzgerald examined the pith and substance of the law that delegated the power to the commission. It was noted that:

The Act, however, also touched on powers that were exclusively in the authority of the federal government, as had been recently determined in Russell v. The Queen. Fitzgerald distinguished that fact with what is now the doctrine of double aspect: "subjects which in one aspect and for one purpose fall within sect. 92, may in another aspect and for another purpose fall within sect. 91."

Consequently, when a law has some overlapping characteristics between the two heads of power, it may still be valid.

References

See also
 List of Judicial Committee of the Privy Council cases

1883 in Canadian case law
Canadian federalism case law
Judicial Committee of the Privy Council cases on appeal from Canada